

Events

By month

March events 
  March 22 – Operations of the Manila Line 1 is extended from Monumento to Balintawak marking the first station to open on the new North Extension of the line.

April events 
  April 17 – The Circle MRT Line Stage 1 and 2 were to be ready for service using the 3 car Alstom train.

May events 
  May 2 – Indian Railways phases out WCG-2 electric locomotives.
  May 23 – The newly extended East London Line begins full service between West Croydon, Crystal Palace and Dalston Junction, following a preview service from April 27 as far south as New Cross and New Cross Gate.
  May 28 – Jnaneswari Express train derailment: A train derailment and collision in the Paschim Medinipur district of West Bengal, India, causes the deaths of at least 141 passengers.

June events 
  June – First Vectron locomotives completed by Siemens Mobility.
  June 8 – The first section of the Gautrain is complete, where trains run between Sandton and OR Tambo International Airport, just in time for the FIFA World Cup being held in the country.
  June 22 – Bergen Light Rail is opened.
  June 25 – The V and W of the New York City Subway make their last rides.

July events 
  July 1 – High-speed trains on the Shanghai–Nanjing line begin running, cutting journey times between the two cities by more than an hour, to just 73 minutes
  July 17 – Narita Rapid Railway begins running, and Keisei-Ueno and Narita Airport Station of the Keisei New Skyliner high-speed express trains opens, making it the second Japanese mainline to be operated at 160 km/h speed (the first was the Hokuhoku Line).
  July 20 – Larsen & Toubro are announced as the preferred bidder for construction of the Hyderabad Metro, costing a proposed Rs122 billion and with an expected finish date of 2014.
  July 29 – Phase 2 of Wuhan Metro Line 1 connecting Dijiao Station to Huangpulu Station and connecting Zongguan Station to Dongwudadao Station opens.

August events 
  August 9 - First day of operation for the Light rail Rhônexpress service linking Lyon city centre and the Airport.
  August 11 - The European Commission approves the €1.9bn acquisition of Arriva by German rail company Deutsche Bahn. Arriva's transport operations in Germany are subject to sale to another operator.
  August 23 - The Suvarnabhumi Airport rail link opens after a four-year delay, connecting Suvarnabhumi Airport with the City Centre.
Construction is scheduled to end sometime in 2015.

September events 
  September 3 - Irish Rail trains began serving the town of Dunboyne after a gap of 43 years. Until the M3 Parkway station is built, all services on the Dublin–Navan railway line will terminate here.
  September 13 - Refurbishment of Newport railway station, which includes a building consisting mostly of ETFE is completed, in preparation of Newport's hosting of the Ryder Cup Golf tournament. Car parking facilities have yet to be finished.
  September 20 - A new Manchester Metrolink station serving the MediaCityUK complex opens, with trams being served via a small spur off the main Eccles Line.
  September 25 – Guangzhou Metro's Line 4 extension connecting Chebeinan to Huangcun opens.

October events 
  October 4 - New restrooms, a larger waiting area, and the re-installation of air conditioning fans first removed in the 1960s are announced as part of Amtrak's Capital funding project for Chicago Union Station
  October 7 - Eurostar places a £700m order for 10 new high-speed trains with Siemens, as well as a refurbishment of its current set of trains. The new trains, dubbed as 'e-320' will also be inter-operable, allowing them to run on much of Europe's high-speed network.
  October 7 - Construction of the planned Mass Transit Tunnel running under the Hudson River and leading into Penn Station is cancelled after a thirty-day risk review by New Jersey Transit and Federal Transit Administration officials revealed costs could exceed as much as double its $8.7bn budget.
  October 15 - 'Breakthrough' is completed in the construction of the Gotthard Base Tunnel after fourteen years of tunnelling.
  October 22 - The Société de transport de Montréal along with Bombardier and Alstom sign a deal worth $1.2bn meaning that 468 metro cars will replace the MR-63 stock on the Montreal Metro. Design and construction will take place at both Bombardier's and Alstom's factories in Quebec.
  October 22 – Operations of the Manila Line 1 is extended again from Balintawak Station to Roosevelt Station marking the last station to open on the new three station North Extension of the line with the North Avenue Grand Central Station being put on hold for 8 years. 
  October 29 - SEPTA's Silverliner V cars in service.

November Events
  November 1 - Construction of phase 2 in building the Seoul–Busan high-speed line is completed, allowing passengers to travel between the two cities in under 2½ hours. The project cost an estimated ₩7 945 billion, with an extra 35,000 passengers per day projected to use this service.
  mid-November - Arenaways, the first open-access railway operator in Italy, begins non-stop passenger operations between Milan and Turin, competing with national monopoly operator Trenitalia using TRAXX locomotives leased from Alpha Trains.

December events 
  December 4 – The extension of the Tōhoku Shinkansen in Japan from Hachinohe to Shin-Aomori opens.
  December 28 – Phase 1 of Shenzhen Metro Line 2 opens connecting Chiwan to Window of the World.
  December 12 – International high-speed service between Helsinki and Saint-Petersburg opens.

Unknown date events 

  – Train travel in Britain during 2010 attained its highest peacetime level since the 1920s, according to the Association of Train Operating Companies. The number of train journeys reached 1.3bn, a figure not seen since 1928. The proportion of people using the train has decreased substantially since then, while the amount of usable rail track has more than halved.

Accidents
  February 15 – The Halle train collision in which a National Railway Company of Belgium local train collides with an inter-city service at Buizingen, killing 19, due to a signal passed at danger and absence of a transmission balise-locomotive system.
  April 12 – The Merano train derailment happens when a train derails between Latsch and Kastelbell, near Merano, Italy, after running into a landslide, causing nine deaths and injuring 28.
  May 23 – The Jiangxi train derailment in which a train travelling from Shanghai to Guilin in Jiangxi, China derails, killing at least 19 people.
  May 28 – The Gyaneshwari Express derailment in the West Midnapore district of West Bengal, India. It is disputed as to whether sabotage or a bomb caused damage to the track, which in turn leads to a train derailment before an oncoming goods train hit the loose carriages killing at least 141 passengers.
  June 6 – The Falls of Cruachan derailment occurs on the West Highland Line in Scotland, when a passenger train travelling between Glasgow and Oban derails after a suspected landslide.
  June 21 – The Yanga train derailment occurs when a train travelling between Brazzaville and Pointe Noire in the Republic of the Congo is derailed and plunges into a ravine. The death toll will have risen to 76 people and injuries to 745 by June 23.
  June 23 – Thirteen die in the Castelldefels train accident at a level crossing in Castelldefels near Barcelona.
  June 28 – Ústí nad Labem derailment at Ústí nad Labem, Czech Republic. The driver is killed and eleven passengers injured.

Industry awards

Japan 
 Awards presented by the Japan Railfan Club
 2010 Blue Ribbon Award: JR East E259 series Narita Express EMU
 2010 Laurel Prize: Kintetsu 22600 series Ace EMU

North America 
2010 E. H. Harriman Awards

Awards presented by Railway Age magazine
 2010 Railroader of the Year: Matthew K. Rose (BNSF)
 2010 Regional Railroad of the Year:
 2010 Short Line Railroad of the Year:

United Kingdom 
Train Operator of the Year
 2010: First Great Western

Deaths 
 March 7 – Mac Sebree, well-known American rail-transport writer and publisher (b. 1932).
 June 23 – Michael Cobb, British railway historian, dies (b. 1916).
 August 20 – Charles S. Roberts, American railroad historian, dies (b. 1930).

References